Roberto Pezzetta (born in Treviso in 1946) is an Italian artist and industrial designer.

He started his Product Design activity in 1969 at Zoppas Elettrodomestici, where he helped in creating the inside team of Industrial Design.

In the second half of the 1970s, after a short experience as chief of Design at Nordica (Ski boots), he returned to Zanussi and its electric appliances where he became in charge of the Industrial Design Center from 1982. In 1984 the Zanussi company merged with the Electrolux Group and the Zanussi Industrial Design Center became one of the three major Design Centers that Electrolux had around the world (Stockholm, Pordenone, Columbus).

Roberto Pezzetta’s professional career was indissolubly tied to that of the big multinational company he was working for. The phases of this career were countless and Zanussi Design became tied to Pezzetta's name for more than twenty years. What made him non typical and far from the current Design Management definition within Zanussi Electrolux was the fact that he had a mark all of his own which made his works stand out, as well as his personal commitment in the designing of products. From January 2002 he became Creative Director for the Design of Electrolux Group, with the title of Vice President Design.

In 2005, having reached the retirement age, he left this position and is now an Industrial Design Consultant. In June 2016 he has been rewarded "Compasso d'Oro Career Award".

The enthusiasm for his job and the belief that a designer’s professionalism gets energy from experiences born in various fields, have always pushed him to approach different fields in the application of Industrial Design. In fact, he co-operates with many companies and shows, facing themes about Industrial Design on a 360° radius.

He is fascinated by the world of communication (in one of his latest works he also touched on the world of the Augmented Reality) and his projects don't stop at the technical formal solution, but push further to the research of the object that can express itself with character, liking and a lot of irony.. In October 2003, an exhibition titled "La Fabbrica e...i Sogni" (The Factory and...the Dreams) was dedicated to him in Oderzo, and it not only summarized the work done for Zanussi Electrolux within the period of time from 1982 until 2002 when he was directly in charge of the Design Center, but it was also dedicated to works he had done for many other companies over the years. The exhibition is documented in a short video: Roberto Pezzetta Works on YouTube.

"The more you enlarge the diameter of your knowledge, the greater the radius of your ignorance. Old Diagram ... applicable to almost all professions ... to the designer especially! "

"A good designer must be a bit artist, engineer, psychologist, sociologist, planner, marketing man and a good communicator; a bit of anything and a bit of everything"

Prizes 
 Compasso d'Oro 1981 at Industrial Design Zanussi.
 Compasso d'Oro alla Carriera 2016.
 Product prize at the Compasso d'Oro del 1987, 1989, 1991, 2008.
 Three honor designations at the Compasso d'Oro 1998, 2001, 2004.
 Two gold medals at the Biennali del Design di Lubiana BIO 12, BIO19.
 Salone delle Arti Domestiche - Paris 1990.
 Goed Industrieel Ontwerp Netherlands 1987, 1991, 1999, 2001.
 Design Prestige in Brno 1997.
 Design Prize MCMXCVIII.  XVI Fiera Internazionale  di L'Avana, Cuba 1998.
 "Good Design" Awards at the Chicago Athenaeum 1999, 2000, 2001, 2002, 2003, 2004, 2009.
 KBD Award (UK) 2003.
 IF product design award 2005.
 Red Dot design award 2005.

Expositions

1987 Compasso D'Oro Exhibition Milan (I)
1987 Compasso D'Oro Exhibition Varsaw, Gliwice, Cracovia, Poznan, Stettino (Poland)
1988 Design in Europa Stuttgart (D)
1988 Compasso D'Oro Exhibition Helsinki (SF)
1988 Image & Design Bolzano (I)
1988 Bio 12 Biennial of Industrial Design Ljubljana (SLO)
1989 Novyj Dom Italia Moscow (URSS)
1989 Design Italiano Budapest (H)
1989 Compasso D'Oro Exhibition  World Design Expo Nagoja (Jap)
1989 Compasso D'Oro Exhibition New York, Orlando, Atlanta, (US)
1989 DESIGN REVIEW Design Museum London (GB)
1990 Civilta' Delle Macchine Turin (I)
1992 Design Future Philosophy Singapore
1992 Straordinario Fortezza da basso Florence (I)
1992 Organic Design Design Museum London (GB)
1992 Bio 13 Biennial of Industrial Design Ljubljana (SLO)
1993 Design Review Design Museum London (GB)
1994 Bio 14 Biennial of Industrial Design Ljubljana (SLO)
1994 Abitare Il Tempo Verona (I)
1995 Abitare Il Tempo Verona (I)
1996 Design Im Wandel Bremen (D)
1996 Bio 15 Biennial of Industrial Design Ljubljana (SLO)
1996 Absolut Design Milan (I)
1996 Moda Lisboa Lisboa (Portugal)
1996 Il Design Ecosensibile International Design Forum Singapore
1997 Expo L'Ocio Madrid (E)
1997 Vision Brno (CZ)
1997 21° Century Home Exhibition Tallinn (Estonia)
1997 Thessaloniki Exhibition (Greece)
1997 Your Home Vilnius (Lituania)
1998 Sinn & Form Berlin (D)
1998 Bio 16 Biennial of Industrial Design Ljubljana (SLO)
1998 Diseño Italiano Madrid (E)
1998 Biennale Internationale du Design de Saint Etienne (F)
1999 Milano Capitale del Design: Il Paesaggio Domestico Milan (I)
1999 L'arte del Design Italiano Praha (CZ)
1999 Roberto Pezzetta Forum for Form Stockholm (S)
1999 Chef Design Milan (I)
1999 Designing in the Digital Age V&A Museum London (GB)
1999 The Shape of Colour "Red" Glasgow (GB)
2000 Good Design Exhibition The Chicago Athenaeum (US)
2000 Abitare Il Tempo: Cucina come. Verona (I)
2000 Les Bons Genies de la Vie Domestique Center Pompidou Paris (F)
2001 Good Design Exhibition The Chicago Athenaeum (US)
2001/2002 Italian Design on Tour.  Zurich, Milan, New York, Venice,  London, Valencia, Coutrai.
2002 Good Design Exhibition The Chicago Athenaeum (US)
2002 Softdesign Venice (I)
2003 Steel & Style Salone del Mobile  Milan (I)
2003 Good Design Exhibition The Chicago Athenaeum (US).
2003 Zoomorphic V&A Museum London (GB)
2003 La Fabbrica E…i Sogni/ Roberto Pezzetta Industrial Designer Oderzo (I)
2004 Design e Nuovi Materiali, Materiali Catalizzatori Per PER L'Innovazione di Prodotto Recanati (I)
2005 Sintesi, Guilio Natta e le Materie Plastiche Museo Nazionale della Scienza e della Tecnologia Milan (I)
2005 Food Design Macef Milan (I)
2005 Simposio Internacional de Diseño Industrial Monterrey (Mexico)
2005 IUAV Design Workshop Design Week A Treviso Treviso (I)
2005 100 Volti per 100 Progetti  Abitare Il Tempo Verona (I)
2005 Architetture D'Interni  Abitare Il Tempo Verona (I).
2008 Eurocucina Salone del Mobile  Milan (I)
2009 Serie Fuori Serie La Triennale di Milano Design Museum Milan (I)
2010 Eurocucina Salone del Mobile  Milan (I).
2012 Abitare Il Tempo Verona (I)
2015- 2016 Cucine & Ultracorpi Triennale Design Museum. Milan (I)
2022 Eurocucina Salone del Mobile-Design in the Kitchen.  Milan (I).
2022 Cleto Munari- Ossessione per la bellezza.  Treviso (I).

Bibliography
 A Dictionary of Modern Design Ed. Oxford University Press.
 Contemporary Details Nonie Niesewand  Ed. Mitchell Beazley Publishers.
 Dalla Casa Elettrica Alla Casa Elettronica  Ed. Electa.
 Design Contemporaneo  Ed. Electa.
 Design The Italian Way  Ed. Editoriale Modo.
 Designing the 21st Century  Ed. Taschen GmbH.
 Dizionario Del Design Italiano A. Pansera  Ed. Cantini Editore.
 Food  Design and Culture  Ed. Laurence King Publisher.
 How Things Work: Everyday Technology Explained   Ed. The National Geographic Society.
 Italy Contemporary Domestic Landscape 1946*2000  Ed. Skira Editore S.P.A.
 Italian Design  Penny Sparke  Ed. Thames and Hudson.
 Italian Modern A Design Heritage  Ed. Rizzoli International Publications, Inc.
 Le Bons Genies de la Vie Domestique Ed. Editios du Centre Pompidou.
 Prodotto Industriale Italiano Contemporaneo Ed. Edizioni L’Archinvolto.
 Storia Del Disegno Industriale Italiano A. Pansera  Ed. Laterza.
 The International Design Yearbook 1986/87  Ed. Thames and Hudson.
 The International Design Yearbook 1987/88  Ed. Thames and Hudson.
 The International Design Yearbook 1989/90  Ed. Thames and Hudson.
 The International Design Yearbook 1992  Ed. Thames and Hudson.
 The International Design Yearbook 1996   Ed. Laurence King Publishing.
 The International Design Yearbook 1998  Ed. Laurence King Publishing.
 Twentieth Century Design  Design Museum  Ed. Carlton Books Limited.
 World Design  Ed. Chronicle Books.
 Design in Cucina Valentina Auricchio Ed. Ottagono  Giunti.

References

Living people
1946 births
People from Treviso
Italian industrial designers